Controlled image base or CIB is unclassified digital imagery, produced to support mission planning and command, control, communications, and intelligence systems. CIB is used as a map substitute for emergencies and crises in the event that maps do not exist or are outdated. CIB is produced from SPOT commercial imagery that has been orthonormalized using the National Geospatial-Intelligence Agency (NGA)'s  DTED. CIB is RPF and NITF compliant. (Source: FAS)

References 

Controlled Image Base (NGA web site)

 (Defense Logistics Agency website)
Military intelligence
Digital geometry
GIS file formats